Zygonyx flavicosta is a species of dragonfly in the family Libellulidae. It is found in Angola, Cameroon, the Democratic Republic of the Congo, Ivory Coast, Equatorial Guinea, Ghana, Liberia, Nigeria, Sierra Leone, Togo, Uganda, and Zambia. Its natural habitats are subtropical or tropical moist lowland forests and intermittent rivers.

References

Libellulidae
Taxonomy articles created by Polbot
Insects described in 1900